Alexandru Ichim (born 21 August 1989) is a Romanian footballer who plays as a defender for Ceahlăul Piatra Neamț.

References

External links
 
 

1989 births
Living people
Sportspeople from Piatra Neamț
Romanian footballers
Association football defenders
Liga I players
Liga II players
Liga III players
CSM Ceahlăul Piatra Neamț players
FC Botoșani players
FC Brașov (1936) players
CS Mioveni players
FC Petrolul Ploiești players
CS Aerostar Bacău players
ACS Foresta Suceava players